Naked Young Woman in Front of a Mirror is an oil on poplar panel painting by Giovanni Bellini. Dating to 1515, it was one of his last works, showing him responding to the tonalism introduced by Giorgione. It was acquired by James Hamilton, 1st Duke of Hamilton in 1638 and remained with his family until 1659, when it was acquired in Brussels by Leopold William of Austria. It is now in the Kunsthistorisches Museum in Vienna.

References

1515 paintings
Paintings by Giovanni Bellini
Paintings in the collection of the Kunsthistorisches Museum